Kingmambo (February 19, 1990 – January 20, 2016) was an American-bred, French-trained  thoroughbred racehorse and sire.

Background
He was sired by the leading stallion, Mr. Prospector, who in turn was a son of Raise a Native, out of the 1999 United States Racing Hall of Fame mare Miesque, who in turn was a daughter of the great Nureyev.

Although born and bred in the U.S., Kingmambo raced in England and France for owner Stavros Niarchos.  Niarchos owned both a U.S. thoroughbred farm, where his mare Miesque was stationed, and a French operation, where he did most of his racing.

Racing career

1992: two-year-old season
As a two-year-old, after winning a six furlong race at Maisons-Laffitte racecourse, Kingmambo placed second in the French Group 1, Prix de la Salamandre, the Group 3 Prix Thomas Bryon, and the Group 3 Prix de Cabourg.

1993: three-year-old season
At the age of three, ridden by the American, Cash Asmussen, and trained by François Boutin, he won the Prix Djebel on his debut, beating Zafonic in an upset. He went on to prove himself to be a genuinely top class colt with three Group One wins in the Poule d'Essai des Poulains, the St. James's Palace Stakes and the Prix du Moulin de Longchamp.

Stud career

Kingmambo was retired to stud in 1994 and stood at Lane's End Farm. He was pensioned from stud duties in 2010.

Kingmambo was euthanized at age 25 on January 20, 2016 due to the infirmities of old age. Kingmambo will be buried at Lane's End.

Major winners
c = colt, f = filly, g = gelding

Pedigree

References

External links
 Pedigree & Partial Stats
 TB Times Stallion Directory Kingmambo

1990 racehorse births
2016 racehorse deaths
Racehorses bred in Kentucky
Racehorses trained in France
Thoroughbred family 20
Chefs-de-Race